Co-Balt is the second studio album by the Athens, Georgia-based band brute., a collaboration between guitarist Vic Chesnutt and the members of Widespread Panic. It was released seven years after the band's debut release, Nine High a Pallet, on April 9, 2002. The night of the release, the band played their final live concert (though they would play a radio show a few weeks later) at The Tabernacle in Atlanta, Georgia.

Track listing
"You Got It All Wrong" – 2:51
"Expiration Day" – 4:32
"Adirondacks" – 4:10
"You're With Me Now" – 3:35
"Scholarship" – 4:28
"Cutty Sark" – 3:36
"Morally Challenged" – 4:36
"No Thanks" – 4:24
"Puppy Sleeps" (Chesnutt, Schools) – 3:44
"All Kinds" – 5:31
"Cobalt Blue" – 8:59
All tracks by Vic Chesnutt unless otherwise noted.

Personnel
brute.
Vic Chesnutt – guitar, vocals, harmonica, keyboards, cover design
John Bell – dobro, vocals
Michael Houser – guitar
Todd Nance – drums, vocals
Dave Schools – bass
John Hermann – organ, piano
Domingo S. Ortiz – percussion
Guest performer
John Keane – pedal steel, guitar (acoustic, electric), vocals
Production
John Keane – engineer, producer, mixer
Chris Byron – assistant
Billy Field – assistant
Glenn Schick – mastering
Scott Sosebee – layout design

References

External links
 Vic Chesnutt.com
 Widespread Panic.com
 Eveyday Companion

2002 albums
Co-Balt (brute.)
Vic Chesnutt albums
Albums produced by John Keane (record producer)
Collaborative albums